Alex Westlund (born December 28, 1975) is a retired American professional ice hockey goaltender who is now working as a coach.

Playing career
Raised in Chatham, New Jersey, Westlund played prep hockey at Chatham High School, starting in goal as a freshman, and at the Lawrenceville School, earning him a spot in 2010 in the New Jersey High School Ice Hockey Hall of Fame.

He attended Yale University from 1995 to 1999, earning All-America Second Team honors. In his final year at Yale, Westlund won the William Neely Mallory Award, "given to the senior man who on the field of play and in life at Yale best represents the highest ideals of American sportsmanship and Yale tradition", according to the Yale website. He left Yale holding several all-time school records including wins, saves and games played. He was also presented with the Ken Dryden Award for the ECAC’s best goalie of the year.

Westlund began his professional career with the Dayton Bombers of the East Coast Hockey League during the 1999–2000 season. His career includes stints in the IHL, ECHL, AHL, in Russia, Slovenia, Austria, Slovakia, Germany, Croatia and China.

Westlund would also play for Team USA at the 2004 IIHF World Championship as the third goaltender, although he didn't have any ice time, his team would win bronze.

Coaching career
He has been working for Pro Crease Goaltending since January 2013. In July 2015, Westlund was named goalie coach of German side Augsburger Panther. Prior to the 2016–17 season, he joined the staff of Medvescak Zagreb of the KHL as goalie coach. On July 8, 2022 he was hired to be the goaltending coach for the Detroit Red Wings under new head coach Derek Lalonde.

Awards and honours

References

External links 

1975 births
Living people
American men's ice hockey goaltenders
Chatham High School (New Jersey) alumni
Ice hockey coaches from New Jersey
Lawrenceville School alumni
Sportspeople from Morris County, New Jersey
HK Poprad players
China Dragon players
AHCA Division I men's ice hockey All-Americans
People from Flemington, New Jersey
Yale Bulldogs men's ice hockey players
Ice hockey players from New Jersey
Dayton Bombers players
Heilbronner Falken players
KHL Medveščak Zagreb players
HDD Olimpija Ljubljana players
Detroit Red Wings personnel
EHC Black Wings Linz players
Hartford Wolf Pack players
Charlotte Checkers (1993–2010) players
Trenton Titans players
Lokomotiv Yaroslavl players
Amur Khabarovsk players
Toledo Storm players
Worcester IceCats players
Milwaukee Admirals players
Cincinnati Cyclones players
American expatriate ice hockey players in Germany
American expatriate ice hockey players in China
American expatriate ice hockey players in Croatia
American expatriate ice hockey players in Austria
American expatriate ice hockey players in Slovenia
American expatriate ice hockey players in Slovakia